Klejdi Daci (born 22 April 1999) is an Albanian professional footballer who plays as a forward for Albanian club KF Teuta.

References

1999 births
Living people
People from Tirana
People from Tirana by occupation
People from Tirana County
Sportspeople from Tirana
Footballers from Tirana
Albanian footballers
Association football forwards
FK Partizani Tirana players
KS Kastrioti players
FK Kukësi players
FK Kukësi B players
Kategoria e Parë players
Kategoria Superiore players